The Civil Service (Management Functions) Act 1992 is an Act of the Parliament of the United Kingdom.  It has 4 sections, and is concerned with the management of the Home Civil Service and the Northern Ireland Civil Service of the UK.

Royal Assent

The Bill was given Royal Assent (and thus became an Act) on 17 December 1992.

Further reading

House of Commons Hansard, http://www.parliament.uk/business/publications/hansard/commons/

References

United Kingdom Acts of Parliament 1992

Reform in the United Kingdom